The 1981 British League season was the 47th season of the top tier of speedway in the United Kingdom and the 17th known as the British League.

Summary
The league comprised 16 teams - one fewer than the previous season. Wolverhampton Wolves had dropped down to the National League.

American Bruce Penhall (who would be crowned world champion by the end of the season) topped the averages and helped Cradley Heathens win their first title. The Cradley team included Penhall, rising Danish star Erik Gundersen and British internationals Alan Grahame and Phil Collins. The league runner-up Ipswich Witches gained some consolation by winning the Knockout Cup.

Final League table
M = Matches; W = Wins; D = Draws; L = Losses; Pts = Total Points

British League Knockout Cup
The 1981 Speedway Star British League Knockout Cup was the 43rd edition of the Knockout Cup for tier one teams. Ipswich Witches were the winners.

First round

Second round

Quarter-finals

Semi-finals

Final

First leg

Second leg

The Ipswich Witches were declared Knockout Cup Champions, winning on aggregate 100-92.

League Cup
The League Cup was inaugurated in 1981 with the 16 teams split into North and South sections comprising 8 teams each that met each other home and away. The winners of each section qualified for the two-legged final with Coventry Bees beating King's Lynn Stars in the final 120-70 on aggregate.

North Group

South Group

Final

Final leading averages

Riders & final averages
Belle Vue

 9.75
 9.08
 7.33 (3 matches only)
 7.00
 6.95
 6.02
 5.60
 5.58
 5.51
 4.74

Birmingham

 9.80
 8.64 
 7.44
 6.41
 5.89
 5.13
 5.06
 4.93
 4.90
 2.14

Coventry

 9.42
 9.41
 8.13
 6.61
 6.58
 6.17
 5.55
 5.46
 3.29

Cradley Heath

 11.01
 9.72
 9.11
 7.58
 5.23 
 5.00
 3.86
 0.70

Eastbourne

 9.67
 9.28 
 6.96
 4.44
 4.24
 3.92
 3.75
 2.89
 2.80

Hackney

 9.58
 7.83
 7.04
 6.28
 5.52
 5.19
 4.94
 3.58
 3.13
 1.06

Halifax

 10.17
 7.82 
 7.80
 6.38
 5.30
 5.16
 4.65
 3.55
 2.98
 0.92

Hull

 9.18
 8.67
 7.28
 5.56
 5.36
 4.83
 4.67
 4.62
 4.11

Ipswich

 8.92
 8.63
 8.07
 6.98
 6.62
 6.16
 6.12

King's Lynn

 10.30 
 9.56 
 7.34
 6.93
 4.51
 4.13
 3.65
 3.16
 2.96
 2.42

Leicester

 8.55
 7.44
R 7.03
 5.96
 5.83
 5.76
 4.90
 4.52
 3.33

Poole

 9.70
 8.42 
 7.68
 7.48
 7.41
 6.56
 6.10
 3.09
 2.52
 1.28
 0.14

Reading

 10.26
 9.66
 9.31
 5.30
 5.00
 4.86
 4.55
 3.82
 1.52

Sheffield

 8.27 
 8.02
 6.64
 5.78
 5.69
 5.62
 5.20
 4.54
 2.33
 1.29

Swindon

 10.30 
 8.55 
 7.52
 7.05
 6.88
 6.03
 4.98
 4.70
 1.78
 0.42

Wimbledon

 8.37
 8.00
 6.92
 6.84
 5.38
 4.38
 4.12
 2.48
 2.30
 1.80

See also
List of United Kingdom Speedway League Champions
Knockout Cup (speedway)

References

British League
1981 in British motorsport
1981 in speedway